Sumaya or Soumaya (Arabic:) is an Arabic feminine given name.

List of people

 Sumaya Farhat Naser (born 1948), Palestinian peace activist
 Princess Sumaya bint Hassan (born 1971), princess of Jordan
 Soumaya Khalifa, American executive of Egyptian origin
 Sumayyah bint Khayyat (died 615), first female Muslim martyr
 Soumaya Naamane Guessous, Moroccan sociologist
 Soumaya Keynes (born 1989), British economist and member of the Keynes family

Arabic feminine given names